Le'an River, also known as Daxishui, is a tributary of the Po River in Wuyuan County, Jiangxi, China. The river rises in Mount Wulong just northeastern Wuyuan County, and flows generally north through Dexing, Leping, and Wannian County to Yaogong Ferry in Poyang County, where it flows into the Rao River. Its main tributaries are Fanxi Stream, Anyin Stream, Chaxi Stream and Jianjie Stream. Le'an River is one of the five longest rivers in Jiangxi.

References

Rivers of Jiangxi
Poyang County
Wuyuan County, Jiangxi